Tina DiJoseph (born January 20, 1968) is an actress, best known for her appearances on the television show Medium.

She was first seen in the first season when she played a Texas Ranger under Captain Push. She appears later as a recurring character, the Mayor's liaison/Deputy Mayor, Lynn DiNovi, whose character enters into a relationship with Detective Lee Scanlon (David Cubitt). The two have a child and later marry.

Personal life
In the fall of 2006, DiJoseph married television writer/producer Glenn Gordon Caron.

External links
 

American television actresses
1968 births
Living people
21st-century American women